Kick Out Zwarte Piet (KOZP) is a Dutch activist organization that campaigns against the  character (in English: Black Pete, or Black Peter) in the culture of the Low Countries. Saint Nicholas Day is also celebrated in the Balkans, Eastern Europe, Central Europe and the Middle East. In the folklore of the Low Countries, Zwarte Piet is portrayed as the dark-skinned Spanish Moor companion to Sinterklaas.

Zwarte Piet is a controversial part of Dutch culture in part due to the perceived likeness to the now-disgraced blackface tradition in the United States.  Because of this, efforts are made by KOZP and some members of the Dutch public in the form of meetings and protests to abolish Zwarte Piet from Sinterklaasavond, often met by opposition from traditionalists who generally argue that Zwarte Piet represents Dutch tradition and not racism.

Objective 
Kick Out Zwarte Piet argue that Zwarte Piet glorifies the history of Dutch colonialism and slavery. The action group advocates a Sinterklaas event featuring only  (in English: "Sooty Petes") or other solutions where possible references to racial characteristics do not play a role. According to KOZP, roles played by Roetpiet would support the celebration of Sinterklaas and no longer refer to a discriminating stereotypical appearance or behavior of dark-skinned people.

History 
KOZP was founded in 2014 via the campaign "" (an initiative of the  foundation), "Stop Blackface" and "". Zwarte Piet is Racisme was a 2012 art project by poet, artist and activist Quinsy Gario and poet and activist Jerry Afriyie. Gario has not been involved in the campaign since. Afriyie is the foreman of KOZP. He stated that he loved Sinterklaas and the processions as a child.

KOZP first appeared just before the arrival of Sinterklaas in Meppel in 2015.

Some anti-Zwarte Piet activists stated that KOZP are too soft. They believe that change is too slow and emphasize more and harder actions.

On 11 November 2019, KOZP accused police of failing to protect its members' safety after four people were arrested for violently breaking up a meeting.

On 20 June 2020, Jerry Afriyie and members of his family were the recipients of a death threat letter signed "" (in English: Pegida Division North), however Pegida Netherlands (the Dutch branch of the German far-right, anti-Islam movement Pegida) have distanced themselves from the letter. An Amsterdam police spokesperson stated that they are aware of the threat, that they have been in contact with Afriyie and that he has filed a complaint. Amsterdam police have begun investigating who the sender is and stated that they take the matter very seriously.

Threat assessment controversy 
According to an article by Robert Toret in the Dutch regional newspaper Leidsch Dagblad, Jerry Afriyie stated at a 2016 KOZP meeting in Leiden that there are several strategies: "" (in English: "One goes singing at the Dam, the other goes to a procession with a bat. I think that they should both be given space.") However, this statement was denied by Jerry Afriyie.

In 2017, KOZP was listed as an "extreme left-wing anti-racist action group" under the heading "" in the "" (DTN) (in English: Terrorist Threat Assessment Netherlands), which is being prepared by the security services. National Coordinator for Security and Counter-terrorism Dick Schoof emphasized that the group had not used violence. Schoof did not rule out the possibility that the movement was potentially extremist and violent. Following a complaint from KOZP, as of 2019 the group would be labeled  as an activist organization that strives to achieve its goals within the limits of the law and not as a left-wing extremist or terrorist organization. KOZP was no longer included in later versions of the DTN but the Zwarte Piet discussion is generally mentioned under the heading "" (in English: polarization), with the blockade on the A7 motorway being mentioned in 2018.

See also 

 Racism in Europe

References 

Anti-racist organizations in Europe
Anti-black racism in the Netherlands
Anti-racism in the Netherlands
Controversies in the Netherlands
Race-related controversies
Sinterklaas